The Hon. Francis Parker was a Conservative Party member of the Parliament of the United Kingdom for Henley from 15 July 1886 to 24 July 1895.

References

External links 
 

1851 births
1931 deaths
Conservative Party (UK) MPs for English constituencies
UK MPs 1886–1892
UK MPs 1892–1895
Parker family
Younger sons of earls